Wheeler Dealers is a British television series. In each episode the presenters save an old and repairable vehicle, by repairing or otherwise improving it within a budget, then selling it to a new owner. The show is fronted by Mike Brewer, with mechanics Edd China (Series 1-13), Ant Anstead (Series 14–16), and Marc Priestley, (Series 17-).

This is a list of Wheeler Dealers episodes with original airdate on Discovery Channel.

Series overview

Episodes

Series 1 (2003)

Series 2 (2004)

Series 3 (2005)

Series 4 (2006)

Series 5 (On the Road) (2008)

Series 6 (2009)

Series 7 (2010) 
This series dropped the two-part format in favour of a single one-hour episode format.

Series 8 (2011)

Series 9 (2012)

Series 10 (2013)

Series 11 (2014)

Series 12 (2015) 
Series 12 was split between Wheeler Dealers new workshops in Huntington Beach, California, and the UK.

Series 13 (2016–17) 
Series 13 is the first series to include the labour time in the on-screen tabulation, and is set completely in the U.S. workshop.

Series 14 (2017–18) 
Series 14 marks the debut of Ant Anstead as the programme's mechanic.

Series 15 (2018–19)

Series 16 (2020–21)

Series 17 (2021–22) 
Series 17 marks the debut of Marc Priestley as the programme's mechanic.

Compilation episodes

References

Lists of British non-fiction television series episodes